Bisheh Boneh (also Romanized as Bīsheh Boneh; also known as Bīsheh Band and Bīsheh Tappeh) is a village in Ashrestaq Rural District, Yaneh Sar District, Behshahr County, Mazandaran Province, Iran. At the 2006 census, its population was 641, in 164 families.

References 

Populated places in Behshahr County